Featherproof Books is a small, independent publisher based in Chicago, Illinois. It was founded in 2005 by Jonathan Messinger and Zach Dodson. They publish perfect bound novels, short story collections and other works, and offer "mini-books" of short stories and novellas for free download. The publisher employs "a dose of humor" in their work, the founders stating that they are "dedicated to the small-press ideals of finding fresh, urban voices ignored by the conglomerates."

Featherproof Books started in March, 2005 using funds raised from the sale of Zach Dodson's car. Featherproof's first title was The Enchanters vs. Sprawlburg Springs by Brian Costello, released in December, 2005, with the second, Sons of the Rapture by Todd Dills having been released in 2006.

Books 
Publications have included:
 The Enchanters vs. Sprawlburg Springs by Brian Costello
 Degrees of Separation edited by Samia Saleem
 Hiding Out by Jonathan Messinger
 This Will Go Down on Your Permanent Record by Susannah Felts
 boring boring boring boring boring boring boring by Zach Plague
 AM/PM by Amelia Gray
 The Karaoke Singer's Guide to Self-Defense by Tim Kinsella
 Sons of the Rapture by Todd Dills
 The Universe in Miniature in Miniature by Patrick Somerville
 Daddy's by Lindsay Hunter
 Scorch Atlas by Blake Butler
 The Awful Possibilities by Christian TeBordo
 The First Collection of Criticism by a Living Female Rock Critic by Jessica Hopper

Mini-books 
Mini-books are a series of self-contained short stories and novellas published periodically. These stories are available online, to be downloaded, printed by the reader, and folded into pocket-sized books. The small size makes them suitable for commuters, and the editors aimed to combine both the "free and easy distribution" provided by the internet with their "love of paper" and the physicality of books.

The free mini-books allow the publisher to work with authors outside of those they publish traditionally. Featured stories have "navigated such diverse topics as failed love, competitive familial golf games and vampires in graveyards".

Contributors 
Contributors have included:
Ambrose Austin, Kate Axelrod, Kyle Beachy, Blake Butler, Tobias Carroll, Pete Coco, Brian Costello, Elizabeth Crane, Mary Cross, Paul Fatturoso, Jeb Gleason-Allured, Abby Glogower, Laura Bramon Good, Amelia Gray, Mary Hamilton, Andrea Johnson, Rana Kelly, Heidi Laus, Ryan Markel, Jonathan Messinger,
Anne Elizabeth Moore, Kerri Mullen, Susan Petrone, Jay Ponteri, Samia Saleem, Kevin Sampsell, Fred Sasaki, 
Timothy Schaffert, Patrick Somerville, Zach Stage, and Scott Stealey.

References

External links 
 Featherproof Books
 Featherproof on Myspace

Companies based in Chicago
Book publishing companies based in Illinois
Small press publishing companies
Publishing companies established in 2005